Streptocarpus brevipilosus is a species of flowering plant in the family Gesneriaceae, native to Tanzania. It was first described in 1964 as Saintpaulia brevipilosa. The former genus Saintpaulia was reduced to Streptocarpus sect. Saintpaulia in 2015, and the species moved to Streptocarpus. It is found in the Nguru Mountains of Tanzania.

References	
	
	
	
	
brevipilosus	
Endemic flora of Tanzania
Plants described in 1964